Tawo is a small town in the north west Hunan province of China

See also 
 List of township-level divisions of Hunan

References

Divisions of Yongshun County
Towns of Xiangxi Tujia and Miao Autonomous Prefecture